Arthur Williams (23 April 1902 – 23 July 1960) was an Australian rules footballer who played for the Footscray Football Club and Fitzroy Football Club in the Victorian Football League (VFL).

Notes

External links 

1902 births
1960 deaths
Australian rules footballers from Victoria (Australia)
Western Bulldogs players
Fitzroy Football Club players